= As Long as You Come to My Garden =

2023 debut album by Damāvand

Studio album by Damāvand
- Released: April 14, 2023
- Genre: Experimental
- Length: 40:30
- Label: Die Schachtel

As Long as You Come to My Garden is the first album by the Italian experimental duo Damāvand, released in 2023 by the label Die Schachtel.

== Critical reception ==
As Long as You Come to My Garden was well received by the music press, with some enthusiastic reviews. The New Noise defined it as "one of the most exciting debuts not only of the Die Schachtel label, but of the entire panorama of new Italian creative music".

Richard Allen on A Closer Listen says "The video teaser for Damāvand's As Long as You Come to My Garden provides an electronic impression, while the album itself is a blend of dark ambient, drone and experimental flavors."

Mirco Salvadori on Rockerilla defined it as "work of fascinating complexity".

== Track listing ==
=== Original release ===
Side one
No.	Title	Writer(s)	Length
1.	"Part 1 or Water Filled Of Immortality"	G. Ceccarini, A. Ciccarelli	5:51
2.	"Part 2 or A gold-embroidered tent"	G. Ceccarini, A. Ciccarelli	8:42
3.	"Part 3 or The Sultan and the Khan"	G. Ceccarini, A. Ciccarelli	5:27
Total length:			20:01

Side two
No.	Title	Writer(s)	Length
1.	"Part 4 or A cypress-tree, sugar thy tongue, in sooth"	G. Ceccarini, A. Ciccarelli	4:32
2.	"Part 5 or Pegasus sprung from the fiery sea"	G. Ceccarini, A. Ciccarelli	9:57
3.	"Part 6 or Thou dost exhale the perfume sweet of clove and cinnamon"	G. Ceccarini, A. Ciccarelli	5:39
Total length:			20:09 40:11

== Personnel ==
Personnel adapted from album liner notes.

Damāvand

- Gianluca Ceccarini (electronics, electroacoustic objects, field recordings, tar)
- Alessandro Ciccarelli (electronics, electroacoustic objects, trumpet, cornet, trombone)

Additional musicians

- Nahid Rezashateri (Vocals on tracks 1 and 6)

Technical staff and artwork

- La chambre d'Éliane, mixing
- Andrea Marutti, mastering
- Fabio Carboni and Bruno Stucchi, Die Schachtel, production
- Bruno Stucchi, graphic design
- Gianluca Ceccarini, Alessandro Ciccarelli, Nahid Rezashateri, photography
